Hayden is a town in Gila and Pinal counties in Arizona, United States. According to the 2010 census, the population of the town was 662.

History
Hayden was founded in 1909 and owned by the Kennecott Copper Corp. In 1912, the company built a  smelter named the "Hayden Smelter". It was the tallest smelter chimney in Arizona. The mine is now owned by the American Smelting and Refining Company. The town is now in the process of becoming a ghost town.

One of the main reasons the people are abandoning the town is that the crime rate is much higher in Hayden than the Arizona average crime rate. It is also much higher than the national average crime rate in the rest of the United States.

Pollution is another factor which has contributed to the abandonment of the town by its residents. The illegal amounts of lead, arsenic and eight other dangerous compounds released by the smelter were so huge that in 2011, the U.S. Environmental Protection Agency (EPA) took action against the smelter.

Hayden's economy began to decline as the mine veins became depleted. The crime rate rose and residents began to move out. There were also political scandals.  Businesses closed, and churches, schools and houses were abandoned or burned. The Valley National Bank abandoned its building, and it now occupied by the Hayden Police Department. According to the mayor, Bob Smith, Hayden has more police cars than police officers.

Geography
Hayden is adjacent to Winkelman.

Demographics

At the 2000 census there were 892 people, 288 households, and 222 families living in the town. The racial makeup of the town was 57.0% White, 0.5% Black or African American, 1.7% Native American, 0.6% Pacific Islander, 35.1% from other races, and 5.3% from two or more races. 84.5% of the population were Hispanic or Latino of any race.
Of the 288 households, 31.6% had children under the age of 18 living with them, 54.5% were married couples living together, 13.5% had a female householder with no husband present, and 22.9% were non-families. 21.5% of households were one person and 9.0% were one person aged 65 or older. The average household size was 3.10 and the average family size was 3.56.

The age distribution was 33.2% under the age of 18, 9.0% from 18 to 24, 20.5% from 25 to 44, 23.2% from 45 to 64, and 14.1% 65 or older. The median age was 32 years. For every 100 females, there were 93.9 males. For every 100 females age 18 and over, there were 91.6 males.

The median household income was $24,293 and the median family income was $26,964. Males had a median income of $35,521 versus $22,500 for females. The per capita income for the town was $9,797. About 20.1% of families and 27.3% of the population were below the poverty line, including 35.2% of those under age 18 and 14.9% of those age 65 or over.

Economy
The economic base of Hayden's economy is the Asarco Hayden Smelter.

Notable people
 Dick Tuck (1924–2018), politician consultant, was born in Hayden.

See also

 List of towns in Arizona

References

External links

  History of Hayden (scroll down)
 EPA Takes Action Against Toxic Arizona Copper Plant, NPR story on Hayden, with video

Towns in Gila County, Arizona
Towns in Pinal County, Arizona
Mining communities in Arizona